Hal Bunderson (born September 21, 1936) is an American politician who served in the Idaho Senate from the 14th district from 1993 to 2006.

References

1936 births
Living people
Republican Party Idaho state senators